Paul Masino (28 September 1911 – 17 February 1993) was a French gymnast. He competed in eight events at the 1936 Summer Olympics.

References

1911 births
1993 deaths
French male artistic gymnasts
Olympic gymnasts of France
Gymnasts at the 1936 Summer Olympics
20th-century French people